Severino Moreira (born 29 September 1913, date of death unknown) was a Brazilian sports shooter. He competed at the 1952 Summer Olympics and 1956 Summer Olympics.

References

1913 births
Year of death missing
Brazilian male sport shooters
Olympic shooters of Brazil
Shooters at the 1952 Summer Olympics
Shooters at the 1956 Summer Olympics
Sportspeople from São Paulo